Patrick Dendy (born March 10, 1982 in Austin, Texas) is a former American football cornerback. He was originally signed by the Green Bay Packers as an undrafted free agent in 2005. He played college football at Rice.

Dendy has also played for the Carolina Panthers in his career.

Professional career
On November 12, 2006, he intercepted his first NFL pass of Minnesota Vikings quarterback Brad Johnson. On September 1, 2007, he was released by the Packers.

External links
Carolina Panthers bio
Green Bay Packers bio

1982 births
Living people
Players of American football from Austin, Texas
American football cornerbacks
Rice Owls football players
Green Bay Packers players
Carolina Panthers players